Thomas Morley (1557 – early October 1602) was an English composer, theorist, singer and organist of the Renaissance.  He was one of the foremost members of the English Madrigal School. Referring to the strong Italian influence on the English madrigal, The New Grove Dictionary of Music and Musicians states that Morley was "chiefly responsible for grafting the Italian shoot on to the native stock and initiating the curiously brief but brilliant flowering of the madrigal that constitutes one of the most colourful episodes in the history of English music."

Living in London at the same time as Shakespeare, Morley was the most famous composer of secular music in Elizabethan England. He and Robert Johnson are the composers of the only surviving contemporary settings of verse by Shakespeare.

Morley was active in church music as a singer, composer and organist at St Paul's Cathedral. He was also involved in music publishing. From 1598 up to his death he held a printing patent (a type of monopoly).  He used the monopoly in partnership with professional music printers such as Thomas East.

Life
Morley was born in Norwich, the son of a brewer. Most likely he was a singer in the local cathedral from his boyhood, and he became master of choristers there in 1583. He may have been a Roman Catholic, but he was able to avoid prosecution as a recusant, and there is evidence that he may have been an informer on the activities of Roman Catholics.

It is believed that Morley moved from Norwich to London sometime before 1574 to be a chorister at St. Paul's Cathedral. Around this time, he studied with William Byrd, whom he named as his mentor in his 1597 publication A Plain and Easie Introduction to Practicall Musicke. Byrd also taught Morley's contemporary, Peter Philips. In 1588 he received his bachelor's degree from the University of Oxford, and shortly thereafter was employed as organist at St. Paul's in London. His young son died the following year in 1589. He and his wife Susan had three more children between 1596 and 1600.

In 1588 Nicholas Yonge published his Musica transalpina, the collection of Italian madrigals fitted with English texts, which touched off the explosive and colourful vogue for madrigal composition in England.  Morley found his compositional direction at this time, and shortly afterwards began publishing his own collections of madrigals (11 in all).

Morley lived for a time in the same parish as Shakespeare, and a connection between the two has been long speculated, but never proven.  His famous setting of "It was a lover and his lass" from As You Like It has never been established as having been used in a performance of Shakespeare's play during the playwright's lifetime. However, given that the song was published in 1600, there is evidently a possibility that it was used in stage performances.

While Morley attempted to imitate the spirit of Byrd in some of his early sacred works, it was in the form of the madrigal that he made his principal contribution to music history.  His work in the genre has remained in the repertory to the present day, and shows a wider variety of emotional color, form and technique than anything by other composers of the period. Usually his madrigals are light, quick-moving and easily singable, like his well-known "Now is the Month of Maying" (which is actually a ballett); he took the aspects of Italian style that suited his personality and anglicised them.  Other composers of the English Madrigal School, for instance Thomas Weelkes and John Wilbye, were to write madrigals in a more serious or sombre vein.

In addition to his madrigals, Morley wrote instrumental music, including keyboard music (some of which has been preserved in the Fitzwilliam Virginal Book), and music for the broken consort, a uniquely English ensemble of two viols, flute, lute, cittern and bandora, notably as published by William Barley in 1599 in The First Booke of Consort Lessons, made by diuers exquisite Authors, for six Instruments to play together, the Treble Lute, the Bandora, the Cittern, the Base-Violl, the Flute & Treble-Violl.

Morley's Plaine and Easie Introduction to Practicall Musicke (published 1597) remained popular for almost two hundred years after its author's death, and is still an important reference for information about sixteenth century composition and performance.

Thomas Morley was buried in the graveyard of the church of St Botolph Billingsgate, which was destroyed in the Great Fire of London of 1666, and not rebuilt. Thus his grave is lost.

Compositions
Thomas Morley's compositions include (in alphabetical order):

 April is in my mistress' face
 Arise, get up my deere
 Cease mine eyes
 Come, lovers, follow me
 Come, Sorrow, come
 Crewell you pull away to soone
 Christes crosse
 Do you not know?
 Fair in a morn
 Fantasia for keyboard, Fitzwilliam Virginal Book CXXIV
 Fantasie: Il Doloroso
 Fantasie: Il Grillo
 Fantasie: Il Lamento
 Fantasie: La Caccia
 Fantasie: La Rondinella
 Fantasie: La Sampogna
 Fantasie: La Sirena
 Fantasie: La Tortorella
 Fire Fire My Heart
 Flora wilt thou torment mee
 Fyre and Lightning
 Goe yee my canzonets
 Good Morrow, Fair Ladies of the May
 Harke Alleluia!
 Hould out my hart
 I goe before my darling
 I saw my Lady weeping
 I should for griefe and anguish
 In nets of golden wyers
 It was a lover and his lass
 Joy, joy doth so arise
 Joyne hands
 La Caccia "The Chase"
 La Girandola
 Ladie, those eies
 Lady if I through griefe
 Leave now mine eyes
 Lo hear another love
 Love learns by laughing
 Miraculous loves wounding
 Mistress mine
 My bonny lass she smileth
 Nolo mortem peccatoris
 Now is the month of maying
 O Mistresse mine
 O thou that art so cruell
 A painted tale
 Say deere, will you not have me?
 See, see, my own sweet jewel
 Shepard's Rejoice
 Sing we and chant it
 Sleep, slumb'ring eyes
 Sweet nymph
 Thirsis and Milla
 Those dainty daffadillies
 Though Philomela lost her love Oxford Book of English Madrigals
 'Tis the time of Yuletide Glee
 Good morrow, Fayre Ladies of the May
 What is it that this dark night
 What ayles my darling?
 When loe by break of morning
 Where art thou wanton?
 Will you buy a fine dog?
 With my love my life was nestled

Sacred music 
 The Burial Service
 De profundis clamavi
 Domine, dominus noster
 Domine, non est exultarem cor meum
 Eheu sustulerunt domine
 The First Service
 How long wilt thou forget me?
 O amica mea

See also
 The Triumphs of Oriana edited by Morley, published in 1601

References

Further reading
 Gustave Reese, Music in the Renaissance.  New York, W.W. Norton & Co., 1954.  
 Article "Thomas Morley" in The New Grove Dictionary of Music and Musicians, ed. Stanley Sadie.  20 vol.  London, Macmillan Publishers Ltd., 1980.  
 The University of Reading Library featuring: Thomas Morley, A Plaine and Easie Introduction to Practicall Musicke. London, 1597 
 Philip Ledger (ed) The Oxford Book of English Madrigals OUP 1978
 The Madrigal, Jerome Roche, 1972.

External links 

 
 
 
 
 More information, including full text, of Morley's Plaine and Easie Introduction to Practicall Musicke at the University of North Texas Music Library's Virtual Rare Book Room
 HTML transcription, with numbered page divisions, of Plaine and Easie Introduction to Practicall Musicke: pp. 1–68, 69–115, and 116–183 and end matter (at the Jacobs (Indiana University) School of Music Center for the History of Music Theory and Literature)

Composers from Norwich
Musicians from Norwich
English classical composers
English madrigal composers
Renaissance composers
English music theorists
English organists
British male organists
Cathedral organists
16th-century English composers
1550s births
1602 deaths
English male classical composers
English Roman Catholics
Male classical organists